"Goodbye Just Go" is a pop song written by Ellen Shipley and Nicky Holland for Belinda Carlisle's third greatest hits album The Collection (2014). It was released as the album's second single in the UK following "Sun" the previous year.

Background
In August 2013 Carlisle's studio albums released in the UK by Virgin were re-issued by Demon Music Group complete with notes and interviews with Carlisle in the booklets. In the Heaven on Earth booklet, Carlisle mentioned that she had re-teamed with long-term  songwriter Ellen Shipley to record the track which was to be released the following Spring along with a song entitled "Why" which she had written ten years previously with Charlotte and Thomas Caffey.

In early 2014, Demon Music Group announced that they would be releasing a new career retrospective entitled The Collection which would include "Goodbye Just Go" as a new song. The song was previewed on Carlisle's YouTube channel on January 24, 2014.

Track listing
 "Goodbye Just Go" (3:38)

References

2014 singles
Belinda Carlisle songs
Songs written by Ellen Shipley
2014 songs
Songs written by Nicky Holland